Ademar Junior or Ademar Jr. may refer to:
Ademar José Tavares Júnior, Brazilian footballer
Ademar Aparecido Xavier Júnior, Brazilian footballer